Izobilny is a town and the administrative center of Izobilnensky District in Stavropol Krai, Russia, located  northwest of Stavropol, the administrative center of the krai. Population: 

It was previously known as Izobilnoye (until 1965).

History
It was founded in 1895 due to the construction of a railroad and was known between 1935 and 1965 as Izobilnoye (. It was granted town status and given its present name in 1965.

Administrative and municipal status
Within the framework of administrative divisions, Izobilny serves as the administrative center of Izobilnensky District. As an administrative division, it is incorporated within Izobilnensky District as the Town of Izobilny. As a municipal division, the Town of Izobilny is incorporated within Izobilnensky Municipal District as Izobilny Urban Settlement.

References

Notes

Sources

External links

Official website of Izobilny 
Izobilny Business Directory 

Cities and towns in Stavropol Krai
Populated places established in 1895
1895 establishments in the Russian Empire